Acrocercops zamenopa is a moth of the family Gracillariidae. It is known from Indonesia (Java).

The larvae feed on Coffea arabica. They probably mine the leaves of their host plant.

References

zamenopa
Moths of Asia
Moths described in 1934